She Does Not Drink, Smoke or Flirt But... She Talks (French: Elle boit pas, elle fume pas, elle drague pas, mais... elle cause !) is a French comedy film directed by Michel Audiard released in 1970.

It was shot at the Billancourt Studios in Paris.

Plot 
Germaine, a housekeeper, has three customers: a substitute bank cashier, a television personality, and a child educator, and learns some of their secrets. Revealing these secrets with ability, she influences that the cashier blackmails the television personality, who blackmails the educator, who blackmails the cashier.

Finally, the cashier murders the educator who blackmailed him, who is then murdered by the television personality. Finally, Germaine blackmails her to obtain an income.

Cast 
 Annie Girardot ... Germaine, the housekeeper of Alexandre, Francine and Monsieur Phalempin
 Bernard Blier ... Alexandre Liéthard, substitute cashier and sexually obsessed
 Mireille Darc ... Francine Marquette, television presenter and former contestant at the "ballets roses"
 Sim ... Monsieur Phalempin, educator at day and drag singer at night
 Catherine Samie ... Jannou Mareuil, a friend Francine
 Jean-Pierre Darras ... Georges de La Motte Brébière, the upcoming husband Francine
 Jean Le Poulain ... Monsieur Gruson, the main cashier, murdered by Alexandre
 Jean Carmet ... Marcel, barman of the "Triolet"
 Micheline Luccioni ... Lucette, called "Lulu", a friend of Alexandre
 Jean-Marie Rivière ... Fernand, the partner of Lucette
 Anicée Alvina ... Monique, the pregnant young girl on the television program
 Monique Morisi ... Juliette
 Daniel Lecourtois ... Monsieur Brimeux, CEO of the bank
 Robert Dalban ... Monsieur Delpuech, the principal of the bank
 Evelyne Dress ... the customer at the bank with the big hat
 Dominique Zardi ... professor of science in the forest
 Jacques Hilling ... the partyman with Francine
 Michel Audiard ... a sound engineer on television
 Marc Doelnitz ... an artist of Alcazar

External links 

1970 films
French comedy films
1970 comedy films
Films based on French novels
Films directed by Michel Audiard
Films with screenplays by Michel Audiard
Films set in Paris
Films shot in Paris
Films shot at Billancourt Studios
1970s French-language films
Cross-dressing in French films
1970s French films